The , abbreviated as Tosho or TSE/TYO, is a stock exchange located in Tokyo, Japan. 

The exchange is owned by the Japan Exchange Group (JPX), a holding company that it also lists. JPX was formed from its merger with the Osaka Exchange; the merger process began in July 2012, when said merger was approved by the Japan Fair Trade Commission. JPX itself was launched on January 1, 2013.

Overview
The TSE is incorporated as a kabushiki gaisha (joint-stock company) with nine directors, four auditors and eight executive officers. Its headquarters are located at 2-1 Nihonbashi-Kabutochō, Chūō, Tokyo which is the largest financial district in Japan.

The main indices tracking the stock market of TSE are the Nikkei 225 index of companies selected by the Nihon Keizai Shimbun (Japan's largest business newspaper), the TOPIX index based on the share prices of Prime companies, and the J30 index of large industrial companies maintained by Japan's major broadsheet newspapers. There are also active bond market and futures market.

Ninety-four domestic and 10 foreign securities companies participate in TSE trading. See: Members of the Tokyo Stock Exchange

Press club 
Most Kabuto Club members are affiliated with the Nihon Keizai Shimbun, Kyodo News, Jiji Press, or business television broadcasters such as Bloomberg LP and CNBC. The Kabuto Club is generally busiest during April and May, when public companies release their annual accounts.

Hours 
The exchange's normal trading sessions are from 9:00 a.m. to 11:30 a.m. and from 12:30 p.m. to 3:00 p.m. on all days of the week except Saturdays, Sundays and holidays declared by the Exchange in advance. The exchange is closed for the following holidays: New Year's Day, Coming of Age Day, National Foundation Day, Vernal Equinox Day, Shōwa Day, Constitution Memorial Day, Greenery Day, Children's Day, Marine Day, Respect for the Aged Day, Autumnal Equinox, Health and Sports Day, Culture Day, Labour Thanksgiving Day, and The Emperor's Birthday.

Stock market

First, Second and other Sections until April 4, 2022 

Until April 4, 2022, corporate shares are listed and traded at Tokyo Stock Exchange in five market sections: the First Section which started when Tokyo Stock Exchange was re-established in 1949 and includes mainly large companies; the Second Section which started in 1961 and includes mainly mid-sized companies; JASDAQ (established in 1991, acquired by Osaka Stock Exchange in 2010, and absorbed into TSE in 2013) and Mothers (Market of the high-growth and emerging stocks, established at TSE in 1999) which are both for emerging companies; and TOKYO PRO Market which was established in 2009 jointly with London Stock Exchange as an Alternative Investment Market (Tokyo AIM) for small companies. 

There were a total of 3,821 companies listed in Tokyo Stock Exchange, as of March 31, 2022.

Prime, Standard and Growth Markets since April 4, 2022 

Beginning April 4, 2022, the market divisions were restructured into the Prime, Standard and Growth market divisions, differentiated by market liquidity, corporate governance, and other criteria. Companies voluntarily selected their new division between September and December 2021, and the results were published on January 11, 2022. From the First Section, 1841 companies were transitioned into the Prime market and 344 companies were transitioned into the Standard market. All 474 companies in the Second Section were also transitioned into the Standard market. From JASDAQ, all 658 companies in its Standard subsection were transitioned into the Standard market and all 36 companies in the Growth subsection were transitioned into the Growth market, along with all 424 companies in the Mothers section.

There were a total of 3,825 companies listed in Tokyo Stock Exchange, as of August 31, 2022.

History

Prewar
The Tokyo Stock Exchange was established on May 15, 1878, as the  under the direction of then-Finance Minister Ōkuma Shigenobu and capitalist advocate Shibusawa Eiichi. Trading began on June 1, 1878.

In 1943, the exchange was combined with eleven  other stock exchanges in major Japanese cities to form a single . The combined exchange was shut down on August 1, days before the bombing of Hiroshima.

Postwar
 
The Tokyo Stock Exchange reopened under its current Japanese name on May 16, 1949, pursuant to the new Securities Exchange Act.

The TSE runup from 1983 to 1990 was unprecedented, in 1990 it accounted for over 60% of the world's stock market capitalization (by far the world's largest) before falling precipitously in value and rank one of the 4th largest exchange in the world by market capitalization of listed shares.

The current TSE building was opened on May 23, 1988, replacing the original TSE building from 1931, and the trading floor of the TSE was closed on April 30, 1999, so that the exchange could switch to electronic trading for all transactions. A new facility, called , opened on May 9, 2000. In 2010, the TSE launched its Arrowhead trading facility.

On 15 June 2007, the TSE paid $303 million to acquire a 4.99% stake in Singapore Exchange Ltd.

The London Stock Exchange (LSE) and the TSE are developing jointly traded products and share technology, marking the latest cross-border deal among bourses as international competition heats up.

In July 2008, the LSE and the TSE announced a new joint venture Tokyo-based market, which will be based on the LSE's Alternative Investment Market (AIM).

Technology problems
The exchange was only able to operate for 90 minutes on November 1, 2005, due to bugs with a newly installed transactions system, developed by Fujitsu, which was supposed to help cope with higher trading volumes. The interruption in trading was the worst in the history of the exchange until October 1, 2020. Trading was suspended for four-and-a-half hours.

During the initial public offering of advertising giant Dentsu, in December 2001, a trader at UBS Warburg, the Swiss investment bank, sent an order to sell 610,000 shares in this company at ¥1 each, while he intended to sell 1 share at ¥610,000. The bank lost £71 million.

During yet another initial public offering, that of J-Com, on December 8, 2005, an employee at Mizuho Securities Co., Ltd. mistakenly typed an order to sell 600,000 shares at ¥1 each, instead of an order to sell 1 share at ¥600,000. Mizuho failed to catch the error; the Tokyo Stock Exchange initially blocked attempts to cancel the order, resulting in a net loss of US$347 million to be shared between the exchange and Mizuho. Both companies are now trying to deal with their troubles: lack of error checking, lack of safeguards, lack of reliability, lack of transparency, lack of testing, loss of confidence, and loss of profits.  On 11 December, the TSE acknowledged that its system was at fault in the Mizuho trade. On 21 December, Takuo Tsurushima, chief executive of the TSE, and two other senior executives resigned over the Mizuho affair.

On January 17, 2006, the Nikkei 225 fell 2.8%, its fastest drop in nine months, as investors sold stocks across the board in the wake of a raid by prosecutors on internet company livedoor. The Tokyo Stock Exchange closed early on January 18 due to the trade volume threatening to exceed the exchange's computer system's capacity of 4.5 million trades per day.  This was called the "livedoor shock". The exchange quickly increased its order capacity to five million trades a day.

On October 1, 2020, for the first time in its history, the Tokyo Stock Exchange had to suspend trading in all shares for a whole day due to a technical glitch, causing buying and selling to freeze. This was announced just minutes before 9 a.m., when it was scheduled to open. The problem was found to be in "the system for relaying market information", hence making the glitch a network problem, but the Asahi Shimbun reported that the glitch was due to a mechanical failure. Japan Exchange Group Inc., which operates the Tokyo Stock Exchange, said that the suspension would be indefinite until the problem was resolved. Other stock markets in Japan also suspended trading. Normal trading was resumed the following day.

See also

List of East Asian stock exchanges
List of stock exchanges

References

External links 

Tokyo Stock Exchange Website
"Tokyo Exchange Struggles With Snarls in Electronics", The New York Times, 13 December 2005
"Fujitsu execs take pay cut after Tokyo exchange crash", The Register, 25 November 2005
Tokyo Stock Exchange Building

Economy of Tokyo
Japan Exchange Group

Stock exchanges in Japan
Financial services companies established in 1878
Japanese companies established in 1878
Postwar Japan
Nihonbashi, Tokyo
Financial services companies based in Tokyo